Eötvös Loránd University (ELTE) is a Hungarian public research university based in Budapest. Founded in 1635, ELTE is one of the largest and most prestigious public higher education institutions in Hungary. The 28,000 students at ELTE are organized into nine faculties, and into research institutes located throughout Budapest and on the scenic banks of the Danube. ELTE is affiliated with 5 Nobel laureates, as well as winners of the Wolf Prize, Fulkerson Prize and Abel Prize, the latest of which was Abel Prize winner László Lovász in 2021.

The predecessor of Eötvös Loránd University was founded in 1635 by Cardinal Péter Pázmány in Nagyszombat, Kingdom of Hungary (today Trnava, Slovakia) as a Catholic university for teaching theology and philosophy. In 1770, the university was transferred to Buda. It was named Royal University of Pest until 1873, then University of Budapest until 1921, when it was renamed Royal Hungarian Pázmány Péter University after its founder Péter Pázmány. The Faculty of Science started its autonomous life in 1949 when The Faculty of Theology was separated from the university. The university received its current name in 1950, after one of its most well-known physicists, Baron Loránd Eötvös.

History

The university was founded in 1635 in Nagyszombat, Kingdom of Hungary (today Trnava, Slovakia) by the archbishop and theologian Péter Pázmány. Leadership was given over to the Jesuits. Initially the university only had two faculties (Faculty of Arts and Faculty of Theology). The Faculty of Law was added in 1667 and the Faculty of Medicine was started in 1769. After the dissolution of the Jesuit order, the university was moved to Buda (today part of Budapest) in 1777 in accordance with the intention of the founder. The university moved to its final location in Pest (now also part of Budapest) in 1784. The language of education was Latin until 1844, when Hungarian was introduced as an exclusive official language. Women have been allowed to enroll since 1895.

Although several Hungarian universities opted for the new foundation model, Eötvös Loránd University remained state-owned.

Academic profile 
ELTE is Hungary's largest scientific establishment with 118 PhD programs at 17 doctoral schools, and also offers 38 bachelor's programs, 96 master's programs, and over 50 degree programs in foreign languages. The course credits awarded are transferable to  universities in Europe through the Bologna process.
 
The nine faculties are (active faculties are in bold):

Timeline (1873-present)

Reputation and rankings

In the 2013-14 QS World University Rankings, Eötvös Loránd University was ranked 551-600th. In the 2018, according to the Times Higher Education World University Ranking, ELTE ranked between 601 and 800. Academic Ranking of World Universities ranked the university among the best 301-400 between 2010 and 2014. International Colleges and Universities ranked the university as the 158th globally.

Campuses
ELTE has campuses at several places in Budapest:

 Egyetem tér in the 5th district (Faculty of Law)
 "Trefort Garden" in the 8th district (Faculty of Humanities)
 Lágymányos campus in the 11th district (Faculty of Science, Faculty of Social Sciences, Faculty of Informatics)
 Buildings in Kazinczy utca (7th district) and Izabella utca (6th district) (Faculty of Education and Psychology)
 Ecseri út in the 9th district (Bárczi Gusztáv Faculty of Special Needs Education)
 Kiss János altábornagy utca in the 12th district (Faculty of Primary and Pre-School Education)

Since 2017, ELTE has a campus named "Savaria University Centre" in Szombathely ( in Latin).

Faculties

Library
The University Library and Archives was founded in 1561 and it is located in 6 Ferenciek tere. However, each faculty of the university has their own library located in different parts of Budapest.

 Library of the Faculty of Humanities
 Library of the Faculty of Law
 Library of the Faculty of Science

The library of Medieval Studies of the Central European University was located in the building of ELTE's Faculty of Humanities.

Notable alumni
Nobel prize winners:
 Lénárd Fülöp, Nobel Prize for Physics (1905)
 Albert Szent-Györgyi, Nobel Prize in Physiology or Medicine for the discovery of Vitamin C (1937)
 Hevesy György, Nobel Prize for Chemistry (1943)
 Békésy György, Nobel Prize in Physiology or Medicine (1961)
 Harsányi János, Nobel Memorial Prize in Economic Sciences (1994)

Other notable alumni:

 Faculty of Humanities
 Faculty of Law
 Faculty of Science

Sport

The Eötvös Loránd University has its own sport club, Budapesti Egyetemi Atlétikai Club (English: Budapest University Athletic Club). The biggest achievement of the association football department of the club was qualifying for the 1924-25 Nemzeti Bajnokság I season. However, in the subsequent season (1925-26 Nemzeti Bajnokság I) the club were relegated to the Nemzeti Bajnokság II and has never been able to qualify to the top flight ever since.https://www.beac.hu/

See also

 Utrecht Network
 List of universities in Hungary
 Virtual Globes Museum

Notes

References

External links

 
 Information brochure (2012) (48 pages)
  (282 pages)

 
1635 establishments in the Habsburg monarchy
17th-century establishments in Hungary
Educational institutions established in the 1630s
Public universities